Nascimento or do Nascimento (meaning birth) is a common Portuguese surname that refers to the birth of Jesus Christ.

It may also originate from the Dutch surname Nassau.

Statistics 
In 2004, about 0.39% of the Portuguese population bore the surname Nascimento.

According to Forebears.io, Nascimento is the 571st most common surname in the world and is most prevalent in Brazil.

Notable people with this surname 
 Abdias do Nascimento (1914–2011), an Afro-Brazilian scholar, artist, and politician
 Alexandra do Nascimento (born 1981), a Brazilian handball player
 Alexandre do Nascimento (born 1925), Roman Catholic cardinal and archbishop in Angola
 Andrêsa do Nascimento (1859–1927), also known as Preta Fernanda
 Eduardo Nascimento (1943–2019), Angolan singer
 Emanuel Nascimento (born 1970), a Brazilian freestyle swimmer
 Fabíula Nascimento (born 1978), a Brazilian actress
 Francisco José do Nascimento (1839–1914), Afro-Brazilian abolitionist
 Francisco Manoel de Nascimento (1734–1819), the Portuguese poet known as Filinto Elysio
 Lopo do Nascimento (born 1942), an Angolan politician
 Luiz Gonzaga do Nascimento (1912–1989), a Brazilian singer, songwriter, musician and poet
 Milton Nascimento (born 1942), a Brazilian singer-songwriter
 Norton Nascimento (1962–2007), a Brazilian actor
 Rodrigo Nascimento (born 1992), a Brazilian mixed martial artist
 Yazaldes Nascimento (born 1986), a Portuguese athlete
 Sandro Barbosa do Nascimento (1978–2000), a notorious Brazilian criminal
 Tuany Nascimento (20th and 21st century), Brazilian ballet dancer and dance teacher

Brazilian footballers 
 Aldair Santos do Nascimento (born 1965), the former Brazilian football defender
 Alfredo José Henriques Nascimento (born 1937), retired Portuguese footballer
 André Luiz Silva do Nascimento (born 1980), the Brazilian footballer
 David de Sousa Nascimento (born 1966), football manager
 Evandro Silva do Nascimento (born 1987), the Brazilian footballer
 Fábio do Nascimento Silva (born 1983), Brazilian footballer
 Gabriel dos Santos Nascimento (born 1983), Brazilian footballer
 Gi Santos - Giovanna dos Santos Nascimento (born 1997), Brazilian women's football player
 Jeovânio Rocha do Nascimento (born 1977), Brazilian defensive midfielder 
 Robert Kenedy Nunes Nascimento (born 1996), the Brazilian footballer
 Leonardo Nascimento de Araújo (born 1969), Brazilian footballer
 Luizão — Luiz Carlos Nascimento Júnior (born 1987), Brazilian footballer
 Matheus Leite Nascimento (born 1983), the Brazilian footballer
 Moacir Barbosa Nascimento (1921–2000), the former Brazilian football goalkeeper
 Nasa - Marcos Antonio García Nascimento (born 1979), Brazilian footballer
 Paulo Sérgio Silvestre do Nascimento (born 1969), the former Brazilian footballer
 Pelé — Edson Arantes do Nascimento (1940–2022), the Brazilian footballer
 Edinho — Edson Cholbi Nascimento (born 1970), the former Brazilian football goalkeeper and son of Pelé
 Rafael da Silva Nascimento (born 1984), Brazilian footballer
 Ramires Santos do Nascimento (born 1987), the Brazilian footballer
 Serginho — Sérgio Paulo Nascimento Filho (born 1988), the Brazilian footballer
 Tinga — Paulo César Fonseca do Nascimento (born 1978), the Brazilian footballer

References 

Portuguese-language surnames